Shahsavar may refer to:

Shahsavar, Chaharmahal and Bakhtiari, village in Lordegan County, Chaharmahal and Bakhtiari Province, Iran
Shahsavar, East Azerbaijan, village in Heris County, East Azerbaijan Province, Iran
Shahsavar, Khuzestan, village in Behbahan County, Khuzestan Province, Iran
Shahsavar, Kurdistan, village in Marivan County, Kurdistan Province, Iran
Shahsavar, Markazi, village in Arak County, Markazi Province, Iran
Shahsavar or Tonekabon, capital city of Tonekabon County, Mazandaran Province, Iran

See also
Shahsavari (disambiguation)